Marcos Roberto da Silva Barbosa (born 21 October 1982, in São Caetano do Sul), known as Marquinhos Silva or just Marquinhos, is a Brazilian retired footballer who played as a centre back.

Career
He started his professional career with Sport Club Corinthians Paulista (Corinthians) where he played for seven seasons 2001 to 2007. He played internationally in Turkey (most notably in İstanbul Büyükşehir Belediyespor commonly known as İstanbul BB) and in Spain.

On 29 April 2020, 37-year old Marquinhos confirmed in his Instagram profile, that he had retired from football.

Honours
Corinthians
Campeonato Paulista: 2001, 2003
Torneio Rio – São Paulo: 2002
Copa do Brasil: 2002

Figueirense
Campeonato Catarinense: 2014, 2015

Avaí
Campeonato Catarinense: 2019

References

External links

1982 births
Living people
People from São Caetano do Sul
Brazilian footballers
Association football defenders
Campeonato Brasileiro Série A players
Campeonato Brasileiro Série B players
Sport Club Corinthians Paulista players
Clube Atlético Mineiro players
Clube Náutico Capibaribe players
Botafogo Futebol Clube (SP) players
Guaratinguetá Futebol players
Figueirense FC players
Avaí FC players
Süper Lig players
Çaykur Rizespor footballers
İstanbul Başakşehir F.K. players
Brazil under-20 international footballers
Brazilian expatriate footballers
Brazilian expatriate sportspeople in Turkey
Expatriate footballers in Turkey
Footballers from São Paulo (state)